Constance DeJong may refer to:
 Constance DeJong (writer) – American writer and performance artist
 Constance DeJong (visual artist) – American sculptor and painter